Palasteriscus is an extinct genus of sea star from the Lower Devonian.

Sources

Prehistoric starfish genera
Devonian echinoderms